Church Coombe is a hamlet in the parish of Redruth, Cornwall, England. It is in the civil parish of Carn Brea.

Church Coombe lies just to the east of the neolithic hilltop enclosure at Carn Brea, which is an ancient monument listed by English Heritage.

References

Hamlets in Cornwall